Neoblastobasis ximeniaella is a moth in the  family Blastobasidae. It is found in Kenya, where it is known from coastal lowland habitats in the south-east of the country.

The length of the forewings is 6.1–6.7 mm. The forewings are pale brown intermixed with a few dark grey scales. The hindwings are pale grey.

The larvae feed on Ximenia caffra and Calophyllum inophyllum.

Etymology
The species epithet, ximeniaella, refers to the generic name of the plant from which the moth was first reared.

References

Endemic moths of Kenya
Moths described in 2010
Blastobasidae
Moths of Africa